Applegath is a surname. Notable people with the surname include:

Augustus Applegath (1788–1871), English printer and inventor

See also
Applegate (surname)